Dingley Bypass is an arterial road in southeastern Melbourne, Victoria, Australia that travels along the Dingley Arterial route from Westall Road to Warrigal Road. After the intersection with Warrigal Road, the highway continues further west as South Road, which extends all the way to the bayside Beach Road at Brighton.

History 
The Dingley Bypass forms part of the Dingley Arterial Project, which was first proposed as a freeway in the 1969 Melbourne Transportation Plan. The Victorian Labor Party first promised to build the bypass before the 1999 state election, but cancelled the project after being elected, choosing to re-allocate the $30 million in funds towards what would eventually become EastLink. The state Liberal Party then promised $180 million to build the bypass if they won the 2002 state election, but they were unsuccessful.

The Liberal–Nationals state government announced in May 2012 that they would commit $156 million for the construction of the Dingley Bypass, which would be a new 6.4 km dual carriageway link between Warrigal Road and Westall Road in Melbourne's south-eastern suburbs.

Construction of the Dingley Bypass began in 2014 and was completed in March 2016, 5 months ahead of schedule. The $156 million, 6.4 kilometre Dingley Bypass was completed five months ahead of schedule and was opened on 11 March 2016 by Minister for Roads, Luke Donnellan. A divided highway with 3 lanes in each direction, it was expected to carry 35,000 vehicles each day. A new 5.2 kilometer bike path also runs beside the Bypass and extends from the existing bike path at Old Dandenong Road and provides links to Victoria's greater bicycle network.

Proposed traffic light removal
In November 2018 leading up to the state election, the Victorian Liberal Party proposed removing all traffic lights on the Dingley Bypass to create a Dingley Freeway. This was expected to cost $600 million. The party eventually did not win the election.

Major intersections 
The bypass is entirely contained within the City of Kingston local government area.

References

Bypasses in Australia
Transport in the City of Kingston (Victoria)
Transport in the City of Greater Dandenong